This is a list of episodes from 2019 for the Stuff You Should Know podcast.

2019 season
 Short Stuff (2019)

References

External links 
 Podcast Archive

Lists of radio series episodes